Hendro Kartiko (born 24 April 1973 in Banyuwangi, East Java) is a retired Indonesian footballer who last played with Mitra Kukar. He normally played as a goalkeeper and is 175 cm in height. He also played for the Indonesia national football team. His debut appearance in the national team was in the Asian Cup 1996 for Indonesia against Kuwait, Indonesia draw 2-2, where he came as a substitute for the injured Kurnia Sandy in the 80th minute. In Asian Cup 2000 Asian people mention him "Fabian Barthez Asia", in this event Indonesia had one draw and two losses in the first round, drew 0-0 with Kuwait, loss 0-4 from China PR and loss 0-3 from South Korea. In Asian Cup 2004 he was chosen as a Man of The Match for Indonesia against Qatar, Indonesia won 2-1. He has 60 caps in the national team since his debut in 1996 and became one of football players in his country with the most appearances in the national team. Since 2007, he has not been chosen again as the number one goalkeeper in the national team. 

Kartiko played for Arema Malang in the 2007 AFC Champions League group stage. Now, he is goalkeeper coach on PSM Makassar.

Honours

Club honors
PSM Makassar
Liga Indonesia Premier Division (1): 1999–2000

Persebaya Surabaya
Liga Indonesia Premier Division (1): 2004
Liga Indonesia First Division (1): 2003

Sriwijaya
Piala Indonesia (1): 2010

Country honors
Indonesia
Southeast Asian Games bronze medal (1): 1999
Indonesian Independence Cup (1): 2000

Individual
AFC Asian All Stars: 2000

References

External links
 

1973 births
Living people
Javanese people
People from Banyuwangi Regency
Sportspeople from East Java
Indonesian footballers
Indonesia international footballers
1996 AFC Asian Cup players
2000 AFC Asian Cup players
2004 AFC Asian Cup players
Persid Jember players
Mitra Kukar players
Persebaya Surabaya players
PSM Makassar players
PSPS Pekanbaru players
Persija Jakarta players
Arema F.C. players
Sriwijaya F.C. players
Indonesian Premier Division players
Liga 1 (Indonesia) players
Association football goalkeepers
Southeast Asian Games bronze medalists for Indonesia
Southeast Asian Games medalists in football
Competitors at the 1999 Southeast Asian Games